Sandra Marquez is a Jeff-nominated actor, director, and educator based in Chicago. She is an ensemble member with Steppenwolf Theatre, Teatro Vista and Remy Bumppo Theatre Company.

Career
Sandra Marquez is an actor, director, and educator. She is also a longtime ensemble member of Teatro Vista, the Midwest's only Equity Latino theatre company, where she served as the company's Associate Artistic Director from 1998-2006. Ms. Marquez has worked at respected companies in the Chicago area and beyond, including Goodman Theatre, Steppenwolf Theatre, Victory Gardens, Oregon Shakespeare Festival, Madison Repertory, and off-Broadway at Second Stage Theatre. She won a Jeff Award for her portrayal of Beatrice in Arthur Miller's A View from the Bridge. She directed Men on the Verge of Hispanic Breakdown for Pride Films and Plays and My Manana Comes for Teatro Vista. She played Clytemnestra in Aeschylus’ Agamemnon at Court Theatre in a new translation by Nicholas Rudall. She has been a member of the theatre faculty at Northwestern University since 1995.

Awards

References 

Year of birth missing (living people)
Living people
American theatre directors
Women theatre directors
Northwestern University faculty